Billy Joe Hagan (March 22, 1932 – November 16, 2007) was a NASCAR owner/driver. He owned Hagan Racing and was known for winning the 1984 NASCAR Winston Cup Series championship with Terry Labonte.

Career
He made three starts in NASCAR's Grand National/Winston Cup division, finishing eighth in his first start, the inaugural Talladega 500 in a self-owned 1968 Mercury Cyclone. He did not field another car until 1975, finishing 19th once again at Talladega. He also fielded a car for five races for Skip Manning.

In 1976, he fielded the #92 Stratagraph Chevrolet Chevelle Laguna for Manning, and he won Rookie of the Year honors. Manning was released in 1978, and replaced by Terry Labonte. Hagan hired Petty Enterprises crew chief Dale Inman for the 1984 season. Labonte won the Southern 500, and won the 1984 championship. Labonte left the team in 1986, and was replaced by Sterling Marlin. Labonte returned to the team in 1991, but was unable to continue their success. 1994, marked Hagan's last season as a single car owner, fielding cars for John Andretti and Randy MacDonald. In 1996, his shop was purchased by Triad Motorsports. Hagan continued to serve as a co-owner of the operation until the team's demise in 1999.

In 1981 Hagan entered a Chevrolet Camaro stock car under the Stratagraph team name in the 24 Hours of Le Mans. Powered by a modified 350-cubic-inch Chevrolet small block, the car qualified well enough in the IMSA GT class, but was sidelined by a crash caused by brake failure. Drivers were Billy Hagan, Cale Yarborough, and Bill Cooper; also listed by some sources was Bobby Mitchell.
The following year, he came 17th at 1982 24 Hours of Le Mans, always on Camaro V8 350 inch Chevrolet small block (#81 team Stratagraph inc.), paired with Gene Felton. The other team car (#80 Camaro V8, Stratagraph inc.) arrives 19th.

Death
Hagan died on November 16, 2007, at the age of 75.

Motorsports career results

NASCAR
(key) (Bold – Pole position awarded by qualifying time. Italics – Pole position earned by points standings or practice time. * – Most laps led.)

Grand National Series

Winston Cup Series

Complete 24 Hours of Le Mans results
(key)

References

External links
 Billy Hagan driver stats
 Billy Hagan owner stats

1932 births
2007 deaths
24 Hours of Le Mans drivers
Racing drivers from Louisiana
NASCAR drivers
NASCAR team owners
ARCA Menards Series drivers
People from Union Parish, Louisiana
World Sportscar Championship drivers